Master Man, in comics, may refer to:

 Master Man (Fawcett Comics), Fawcett Comics superhero
 Master Man (Marvel Comics), Marvel Comics villain
Master Man (Quality Comics), Kid Eternity villain who made several appearances

fr:Master Man